Md. Enamur Rahman is a Bangladesh Awami League politician and the incumbent Member of Parliament from Savar.

Career
Rahman is the founding chairman of Enam Medical College and Hospital. He was elected to parliament in 2013 from Dhaka-19 unopposed.

References

Awami League politicians
Living people
11th Jatiya Sangsad members
10th Jatiya Sangsad members
1957 births